Stephen Pace may refer to:

 Stephen Pace (artist) (1918–2010), American painter
 Stephen Pace (politician) (1891–1970), American politician and lawyer